Salamah was a Palestinian Arab village, located five kilometers east of Jaffa, that was depopulated in the lead-up to the 1948 Arab-Israeli War. The town was named for Salama Abu Hashim, a companion of the Islamic prophet Muhammad. His tomb, two village schools, and ten houses from among the over 800 houses that had made up the village, are all that remain of the structures of the former village today. The historic road from Jaffa to the village is now a street on the border of Tel Aviv and Jaffa, still commonly called "Salameh road".

History

Ottoman era
In 1596, under Ottoman rule, Salamah was a village in the nahiya of Ramla (liwa of Gaza), with a population of 17 Muslim households, an estimated 94 persons. They paid a fixed tax-rate of 25 % on agricultural products, including wheat and barley, as well as on other types of property, such as goats and beehives; a total of 1,000 Akçe.

An Ottoman village list of about 1870 showed that Salama had 73 houses and a population of 216, though the population count included only men.

In 1882 the PEF's Survey of Western Palestine described the village as being built of adobe brick, with a few gardens and wells.

British Mandate era
In the 1922 census of Palestine conducted by the British Mandate authorities, Salameh had a population of 1,187, all Muslims, increasing in the 1931 census to 3,691 inhabitants, still all Muslims, in 800 houses.

An elementary school for boys was opened in 1920, and by 1941 it had 504 boys enrolled. In 1936 an elementary school for girls was opened, which had 121 girls enrolled by 1941.

In the 1945 statistics the population had increased to 6,730, of whom 60 were Christians and 6,670 Muslims. The total land area was 6,782 dunams, according to an official land and population survey. 3,248 dunams were allocated for citrus and bananas, 684 were for plantations and irrigable land, 2,406 for cereals, while 114 dunams were classified as built-up (urban) areas.

1948 War
On 4 December 1947 a band of 120–150 gunmen from Salame attacked nearby kibbutz Ef'al. The residents, together with Palmah reinforcements, beat them off. On 8 December 1947 Arabs attacked the Tel Aviv neighbourhood Hatiqwa. Some of the Jewish residents were killed. Most of the attackers were Salame residents.

In January and February 1948 Palmah raiders destroyed houses in Yazur and Salamah. Their operational orders for Salamah were:The villagers do not express opposition to the actions of the [Arab] gangs and a great many of the youth even provide [the (Arab) irregulars with] active cooperation ... The aim is ... to attack the northern part of the village ... to cause deaths, to blow up houses and to burn everything possible. A qualification stated: 'Efforts should be made to avoid harming women and children.'
Benny Morris goes on to explain, "The destruction of most of the sites was governed by the cogent military consideration that, should they be left intact, irregulars, or, come the expected invasion, Arab regular troops, would reoccupy and use them as bases for future attacks. An almost instant example of this problem was provided at Qastal in early April."

The village of Salamah finally was depopulated in the weeks leading up to the 1948 Arab–Israeli war, during Haganah's offensive Mivtza Hametz (Operation Hametz) 28–30 April 1948, against a group of villages east of Jaffa. According to the preparatory orders, the objective was to "opening the way [for Jewish forces] to Lydda". Though there was no explicit mention of the prospective treatment of the villagers, the order spoke of "cleansing the area" [tihur hashetah]. The final operational order stated: "Civilian inhabitants of places conquered would be permitted to leave after they are searched for weapons." It cautioned against looting and "'undisciplined acts [maasei hefkerut], robbery, or harming holy places.'" Prisoners were to be moved to headquarters.

During 28–30 April, the Haganah took Salamah without a fight, the HIS attributed the non-resistance of the inhabitants to prior Arab defeats and added that "it is clear that the inhabitants have no stomach for war and ... would willingly return to their villages and accept Jewish protection."
According to an AP article of 1 May 1948,
  Jewish troops moved into Salamah, key Arab position in the Jaffa perimeter, without firing a shot after maneuvering the Arabs into a position where they had no choice but to withdraw.
  Streets and houses in Salama were deserted when the Jews arrived.
  The Arab troops and the 12,000 civilians there had fled down a narrow escape corridor which the Jews purposely had kept open.

When David Ben-Gurion visited Salamah on 30 April he encountered "only one old blind woman". A day or two later, "hooligans" from Tel Aviv's Hatikva Quarter torched several buildings.

Settlement of the depopulated village with Jewish war refugees, and later by new immigrants, began two weeks after its conquest. On 10 December 1948, Salamah and some of its agricultural land was annexed to Tel Aviv. By this time, half of the population of Salame had been former residents of Tel Aviv who had their homes destroyed during the war; and the other half, new Jewish immigrants. Today the village site is part of the Kfar Shalem neighborhood of Tel Aviv.

See also
 Mustafa al-Hallaj
 Kafr 'Ana
 Depopulated Palestinian locations in Israel
 List of villages depopulated during the Arab–Israeli conflict
 Mount Hope (1853–1858), a nearby farm established by Christians, harassed and attacked by people from Salama

People from Salamah
Mustafa al-Hallaj

References

Bibliography

External links
Welcome To Salamah
Salama, Zochrot
Survey of Western Palestine, Map 13: IAA, Wikimedia commons
Salameh from the Khalil Sakakini Cultural Center
Salama by Rami Nashashibi (1996), Center for Research and Documentation of Palestinian Society.
  by Omer Carmon, 15 August 2005

District of Jaffa
Arab villages depopulated prior to the 1948 Arab–Israeli War